Kabongo Mulumba is a Democratic Republic of the Congo karateka. He won a bronze medal at the 2019 African Karate Championships in the men's –84 kg category.

References

Democratic Republic of the Congo male karateka
Living people
Year of birth missing (living people)
21st-century Democratic Republic of the Congo people